Epiperipatus hyperbolicus is a species of velvet worm in the family Peripatidae. The males of this species have 23 pairs of legs; females have 24 or 25 pairs. The type locality is in Alagoas state in Brazil.

References 

Onychophorans of tropical America
Onychophoran species
Animals described in 2018